The Prince of Hexi was a title used by monarchs of the Northern Liang dynasty of China. The title was first adopted in 412, then affirmed by the Emperor Shao of Liu Song in 423. The princes include:
 Juqu Mengxun, 412–433
 Juqu Mujian, 433–439
 Juqu Wuhui, 442–444
 Juqu Anzhou, 444–460

Chinese princes
Chinese royal titles